Spring Foundation School is a private non-denominational coeducational Christian school located in Bonny Island, Rivers State, Nigeria. The school was established to partner with parents and to provide a Christ-centered learning atmosphere where children are encouraged to grow intellectually and spiritually. The school provides education to senior secondary, junior secondary, primary, nursery and pre-nursery levels. The current principal of the school in charge of discipline is Precious Akunna.

School uniforms
All students of Spring Foundation are required to attend classes in school uniforms. For Mondays, Tuesdays and Thursdays, the uniform is white and black draft shirt on an ox-blood trouser, black shoes and belt. On Wednesdays, the uniform is pink and white checkered shirt while the school's sports wears are for Fridays only.

Houses
Every student admitted to the school is assigned to one of its  four houses. These houses participate in various sporting and cultural competitions throughout the year. The current houses are: Nelson Mandela (Blue), Mahatma Gandhi (Yellow), Martin Luther King (Green) and Lord Lugard (Red).

Achievements
In 2015, the school won the NNPC/MPN Quiz Competition in Bonny, scoring 34 points.

See also

List of schools in Rivers State

References

External links

1998 establishments in Nigeria
1990s establishments in Rivers State
Private schools in Rivers State
Educational institutions established in 1998
Primary schools in Rivers State
Christian schools in Nigeria
Secondary schools in Rivers State